Yuri Lebedev may refer to:

 Yuri Lebedev (born 1951), Soviet Russian ice hockey player
 Yuri Yuryevich Lebedev (born 1987), Russian footballer